Amphicestonia is a genus of bristle flies in the family Tachinidae.

Species
Amphicestonia dispar Villeneuve, 1939
Amphicestonia perplexa Mesnil, 1963

References

Exoristinae
Tachinidae genera
Diptera of Asia
Diptera of Europe
Taxa named by Joseph Villeneuve de Janti